Thomas J. Cox (October 1, 1876 – November 23, 1930) was an American politician and hotel owner from New York.

Life 
Cox was born on October 1, 1876, in Brooklyn, New York. He attended St. Paul's Parochial School. He began working as a locker attendant in the Parkway Baths on Ocean Parkway. He eventually became proprietor of Cox's Hotel and Baths at Henderson's Walk on Coney Island.

In 1918, Cox was elected to the New York State Assembly as a Democrat, representing the Kings County 2nd District. He served in the Assembly in 1919. In 1921, he was elected to the New York City Board of Aldermen. He served as alderman for the next eight years. In January 1930, he was appointed Deputy Commissioner of Hospitals.

Cox was married to Katherine Gibbons. He was a member of the Coney Island Board of Trade, the Madison Club, the Union Club, the Knights of the Maccabees, and the Elks.

Cox died at home from heart disease on November 23, 1930. He was buried in Holy Cross Cemetery.

References

External links 
 The Political Graveyard

1876 births
1930 deaths
Politicians from Brooklyn
People from Coney Island
Catholics from New York (state)
New York City Council members
20th-century American politicians
Democratic Party members of the New York State Assembly
American hoteliers
Burials at Holy Cross Cemetery, Brooklyn